Draco fimbriatus, the fringed flying dragon or crested gliding lizard, is a species of agamid lizard. It is found in Malaysia, Indonesia, the Philippines, and Thailand.

References

Draco (genus)
Reptiles of  Malaysia
Reptiles described in 1820
Taxa named by Heinrich Kuhl
Reptiles of Borneo